Albie Larrison Hood (January 13, 1903 – October 14, 1988) is a former Major League Baseball player. He played one seasons with the Boston Braves between July 13 and July 17, 1925. In only five games with the Braves, he managed a home run, two doubles and three singles.

References

External links
 

Boston Braves players
Major League Baseball second basemen
1903 births
1988 deaths
Baseball players from North Carolina
Greeneville Burley Cubs players
Richmond Colts players
Portsmouth Truckers players
Waterbury Brasscos players
Mobile Bears players
Charlotte Hornets (baseball) players
Allentown Buffaloes players
Norfolk Tars players
People from Sanford, North Carolina